Horse Creek is a  long 3rd order tributary to Drowning Creek (Lumber River), in Moore County, North Carolina.  The water of Horse Creek is classed as WS-II and HQW (High-Quality Water).

Course
Horse Creek rises on Joes Fork divide about 0.25 miles southwest of Pinehurst in Moore County, North Carolina.  Horse Creek then takes a southerly course through numerous swamps to meet Drowning Creek about 2 miles southwest of Addor.

Watershed
Horse Creek drains  of area, receives about 49.2 in/year of precipitation, has a topographic wetness index of 466.77 and is about 37% forested.

References

Rivers of North Carolina
Rivers of Moore County, North Carolina